Mutum may refer to:

 Mutum (band), a Brazilian band
 Mutum (film) (2007), a Brazilian film directed by Sandra Kogut, based on the novel Campo Geral (1964) by João Guimarães Rosa
 Mutum, Minas Gerais, a city in the Brazilian state of Minas Gerais
 Mutum, one of the family names in the Indian state of Manipur
 Red-knobbed curassow, a Brazilian bird

See also 
 Mutum River (disambiguation)